The 1978 Colorado gubernatorial election was held on November 7, 1978. Incumbent Democrat Richard Lamm defeated Republican nominee Ted L. Strickland with 58.76% of the vote.

Primary elections
Primary elections were held on September 12, 1978.

Democratic primary

Candidates
Richard Lamm, incumbent Governor

Results

Republican primary

Candidates
Ted L. Strickland, State Senator
Richard H. Plock Jr., State Senator

Results

General election

Candidates
Major party candidates
Richard Lamm, Democratic
Ted L. Strickland, Republican 

Other candidates
Roy Peister, Independent
Elsa Blum, Socialist Workers
Sal A. Mander, Independent
Earl F. Dodge Jr., National Statesman

Results

References

1978
Colorado
Gubernatorial